Visnapuu may refer to:

Visnapuu, village in Kambja Parish, Tartu County, Estonia
Henrik Visnapuu (1890–1951), Estonian poet and dramatist
Indrek Visnapuu (born 1976), Estonian basketball player and coach

Estonian-language surnames